Felix Williamson is an Australian actor.

Early life
Williamson is the stepson of playwright David Williamson. From age 13–17, he trained at the Australian Theatre for Young People in Sydney, Australia, learning the foundations of acting.

Career
He has had many roles in television, film and theatre and portrayed Paul Keating in the 2010 telemovie, Hawke opposite Richard Roxburgh's Bob Hawke.

He portrays a Commonwealth Bank executive in various advertisements for the bank, usually in the role of rebuffing advice from incompetent American advertisement consultants who display ignorance of Australian society and buffoon-like behaviour.
Felix has taken part in a variety of television shows including famous to CBBC, Me and My Monsters playing Nick Carlson (Dad), and Underbelly: Razor.

Personal life
Williamson lives with his wife, theatre producer Liz Fell, who together ran Naked Theatre Company from 2001 to 2005.

Credits
 Police Rescue (1993)
 Water Rats (1997)
 Welcome to Woop Woop (1997)
 Thank God He Met Lizzie (1997)
 Wildside
 Murder Call
 Babe: Pig in the City (1998)
 Me Myself I (1999)
 Strange Planet (1999)
 Dog's Head Bay
 Farscape (3 episodes, 2000)
 Mr. Accident (2000)
 My Brother Jack (2001)
 The Road from Coorain (2002)
 Dirty Deeds (2002)
 The Wannabes (2003)
 The Rage in Placid Lake (2003)
 Home and Away (2003)
 Ned (2003)
 Blue Heelers (2004)
 RAN Remote Area Nurse (2006)
 Stupid, Stupid Man (2006)
 Lost (2006)
 Hawke (2010) as Paul Keating
 Me and My Monsters (2010) as Nick Carlson
 Underbelly: Razor as Phil "The Jew" Jeffs (2011)
 Miss Fisher's Murder Mysteries “Murder in the Dark” (2012)
 The Great Gatsby as Henri (2013)
 Backyard Ashes (2013)
 Here Come the Habibs (2016–2017)
 Peter Rabbit (2018)
 Occupation (2018)
 Little Monsters (2019)

References

External links

http://catalogue.nla.gov.au/Record/817978

Living people
20th-century Australian male actors
21st-century Australian male actors
Australian male film actors
Australian male television actors
Year of birth missing (living people)